Para Site is an independent, non-profit art space based in Hong Kong. It was founded in 1996 by artists Patrick Lee, Leung Chi-wo, Phoebe Man Ching-ying, Sara Wong Chi-hang, Leung Mee-ping, Tsang Tak-ping and Lisa Cheung. It produces exhibitions, public programmes, residencies, conferences and educational initiatives that aim to develop a critical understanding of local and international contemporary art.

As Hong Kong’s first artist-run art space, it has helped bring recognition to local artists. It has since grown into a site of international relevance with a reputation for cutting-edge programming for the visual arts.

The organization is currently headed by Executive Director, Cosmin Costinas and Deputy Director, Claire Shea.

History 

Para Site was first founded in Kennedy Town in 1996. It moved to a 500-sq-ft space in Po Yan Street, Sheung Wan in 1997. In March 2015, it relocated to its current premises in North Point, a neighbourhood which had previously been a refugee camp and gathering place for mainland Chinese from the 1930s to late 1940s.

The move facilitated an expansion of Para Site’s programs with upgraded exhibition amenities, such as a room dedicated to education projects. Tobias Berger, curator at M+ and Executive Director of Para Site at the time, said that the move represented ‘a big step forward for the non-profit sector’.

Exhibitions 
Para Site produces 8-10 exhibitions a year, engaging local and international artists and curators. These are accompanied by regular talks, screenings, performances, and guided tours.

Recent exhibitions 

 Koloa: Women, Art, and Technology, 2019-2020
 Café do Brasil, 2019
 Bicycle Thieves, 2019
 An Opera for Animals, 2019
 Ellen Pau: What about Home Affairs? - A Retrospective, 2018-2019
 Crush, 2018
 KOTODAMA, 2018
 A beast, a god, and a line, 2018
 Chris Evans, Pak Sheung Chuen: Two Exhibitions, 2017
 Soils and Stones, Souls and Songs, 2017
 In Search of Miss Ruthless, 2017
 That Has Been, and May Be Again, 2016
 Afterwork, 2016 
 The world is our home. A poem on abstraction, 2015-16
 A Luxury We Cannot Afford, 2015
 Imagine there’s no country, Above us only our cities, 2015
 A Hundred Years of Shame – Songs of Resistance and Scenarios for Chinese Nations, 2015
 Ten Million Rooms of Yearning. Sex in Hong Kong, 2014
 Great Crescent: Art and Agitation in the 1960s—Japan, South Korea, and Taiwan, 2013-2014
 A Journal of the Plague Year. Fear, ghosts, rebels. SARS, Leslie and the Hong Kong story, 2013

Major travelling exhibitions 

 Koloa: Women, Art, and Textiles, Langafonua Center, Nuku'alofa, Tonga, 2019.
 A beast, a god, and a line, Kunsthall Trondheim, Norway, 2019; Museum of Modern Art in Warsaw, Poland, 2018; Pyinsa Rasa Art Space at The Secretariat & Myanm/art Gallery, Yangon, 2018; Dhaka Art Summit, 2018.
 An Opera for Animals, Rockbund Art Museum, Shanghai, 2019
 Chris Evans, Pak Sheung Chuen: Two Exhibitions, Hong-gah Museum, Taipei, 2019
 Great Crescent: Art and Agitation in the 1960s—Japan, South Korea, and Taiwan in Mexico City, Museo Universitario Arte Contemporáneo, Mexico; Mori Art Museum, Tokyo, 2015-2016.
 A Journal of the Plague Year, Kadist Art Foundation, San Francisco; Arko Art Center, Seoul, Korea; TheCube Project Space, Taipei, Taiwan; 2014-2015.
 Taiping Tianguo: A History of Possible Encounters: Ai Weiwei, Frog King Kwok, Tehching Hsieh, and Martin Wong, e-flux, New York; NUS Museum, Singapore; SALT, Istanbul; 2013-2014.

Education

Conferences 
Since 2013, Para Site has hosted an annual international conference. The three-day event brings together professionals in the field from both Hong Kong and abroad in debating issues of relevance in contemporary exhibition making. The conferences are free of charge and open to the public.

Emerging Curators Program 
The annual emerging curators programme is an open-call process that culminates in a summer exhibition at Para Site. It was initiated in 2014. Past exhibitions stemming from the program include Imagine there’s no country, Above us only our cities, by Jims Lam Chi Hang, in 2015 and That Has Been, and May be Again, by Leo Li Chen and Wu Mo, in 2016.

Workshops for Emerging Professionals 
In 2015, Para Site launched a week-long series of workshops for emerging professionals in conjunction with its annual conference. The curatorial mentorship program includes participants from varying professional backgrounds from across the region and the world.

Residencies 
The Para Site International Art Residency (PSIAR) is an invitation-only programme that brings artists, curators and writers to Hong Kong for a period of up to two months. Participants engage with the local and regional art scene through studio visits, performances, screenings and talks.

Publications 
Para Site published a quarterly bilingual magazine, P/S, from 1997 to 2006. It was Hong Kong’s first visual arts magazine, and provided a platform for the development of art writing. It has also published numerous catalogues, such as exhibition readers for its travelling exhibitions Taiping Tianguo: A History of Possible Encounters (2012) and A Journal of the Plague Year (2013).

Other programs

Migrant domestic workers project 
From July 2015 to 2016, Para Site organized a series of photography, art, education and literature programmes to engage the migrant domestic worker community. Collaborating with local grassroots organizations, these projects included “Room to Read”, an initiative that brought the writings of domestic workers into the wider community through reading groups, as well as photography workshops, in partnership with Lensational.

Board of Directors
Para Site is a registered charity with the Hong Kong Inland Revenue Department. It is managed by a Board of Directors, co-chaired by Alan Lau Ka Ming, Mimi Chun Mei-Lor, and Jehan Pei Chung Chu. Other members of the board include Bonnie Chan Woo Tak Chi, Sara Wong Chi Hang, Kurt Chan Yuk Keung, Alan Y Lo, Mina Park.

Funding 
Para Site receives financial support from the Hong Kong Arts Development Council, private patrons, and an annual fundraising auction. It also receives grants from the Robert H. N. Ho Family Foundation and the Foundation for Arts Initiatives.

In 2014, it was awarded a consecutive Springboard Grant of HK$4.5 million from the Home Affairs Bureau, Art Capacity Development Funding Scheme.

References 

Hong Kong art
Art museums and galleries in Hong Kong
Non-profit organisations based in Hong Kong